Algiers Opera House is an opera house in Ouled Fayet, Algiers, Algeria. It was built in 2016 by the Chinese government. The former opera house is the Algerian National Theater Mahieddine Bachtarzi.

References

Cultural infrastructure completed in 2016
Buildings and structures in Algiers
Opera houses in Algeria
21st-century architecture in Algeria